Whack World is the debut studio album by American rapper Tierra Whack. It was released on May 30, 2018, by Interscope Records. The album is mainly produced by Kenete Simms and Nick Verruto, and conscripts other producers including J Melodic, RicandThadeus, DJ Fly Guy, and Scott Styles. It was mixed and engineered by Kenete Simms and mastered by Chris Athens. The album artwork—of an arcade claw machine—was designed by Nick Canonica and features a sculpture made by Philadelphia artist Caroline Kunka.

Background
Whack was bullied as a child for being black in a predominantly white school, which inspired much of the "emotional labor" that was done on the album. With each song length being a minute long, Tierra Whack released a 15-minute visual album with a music video for each track. Whack says that she's a visual learner, and the visuals for Whack World allowed her to bring her ideas to life and “bring truth to the viewer’s eye.” Regarding the many changes in her voice, Whack spoke to Billboard saying:

Critical reception

The album was critically acclaimed and received positive reviews. Pitchfork praised the album, giving it a 8.3 out of 10 rating, saying: "Whack World is a funhouse of minute-long vignettes, teetering between a fantastic dream and an unsettling nightmare. Lyrics share double meanings with the corresponding 15-minute visual Whack released alongside the album, which adds even more dimension and intrigue to the ambitious project; light and dark are forced to coexist." The author also claimed that the visual album is "prepackaged for optimum social media consumption; every tiny piece stands on its own without losing sight of the larger picture. At its core, though, Whack's sense of humor—her captivating depiction of a black woman's imagination—is an opportunity to celebrate an aspect of art that often goes uncelebrated, an opportunity for Whack to celebrate herself." In a Wired piece about women in the music industry in 2019, the author wrote that Whack World was working to destabilize the popular maximalist narrative currently characterizing music. NPR hip hop writer Rodney Carmichael praised Whack's dream logic that characterizes the visual album, saying “each song vignette offers a deeper level of revelation into her black girl’s blues.”

Accolades

Track listing

References

2018 debut albums
Tierra Whack albums
Interscope Records albums
Concept albums